Raj Mangal Pande (10 May 1920 – 22 November 1993) was an Indian politician. He was elected to 9th Lok Sabha from Deoria constituency of Uttar Pradesh as a member of the Janata Dal. He served as Minister of Human Resource Development in Chandra Shekhar government from 1990 to 1991.

Early life 
Raj Mangal Pande was born on 10 May 1920 at Sohang in Deoria district of United Provinces, British India (now Uttar Pradesh). He was awarded Bachelor of Arts and Bachelor of Law degree at Allahabad University. He participated in freedom struggle movements. In 1933, he married Saraswati Devi. The couple had 3 sons and 4 daughters.

Political career 
He was elected as Member of Legislative Assembly four times consecutively. In 1969 and 1974, he won on Congress ticket. In 1977, he joined Janata Party and fought Uttar Pradesh assembly election on Janata Party ticket. In 1984, he was elected to 8th Lok Sabha from Deoria constituency on Congress ticket. Later in 1989, he joined Janata Dal and was re-elected from Deoria constituency to 9th Lok Sabha.

In November 1990, he was one of the 64 MPs who left Janata Dal and formed Chandra Shekhar government. He was made Minister of Human Resource Development in Chandra Shekhar government.

References

External links 
 Official biographical sketch in Parliament of India website

1920 births
Janata Party politicians
Janata Dal politicians
Lok Sabha members from Uttar Pradesh
India MPs 1984–1989
Indian National Congress politicians
Indian Congress (Socialist) politicians
Congress for Democracy politicians
Indian National Congress (U) politicians
Education Ministers of India
Members of the Cabinet of India

India MPs 1989–1991
Chandra Shekhar administration
Samajwadi Janata Party politicians
1993 deaths
Uttar Pradesh MLAs 1969–1974
Uttar Pradesh MLAs 1974–1977
Uttar Pradesh MLAs 1977–1980
Uttar Pradesh MLAs 1980–1985